Los reyes del volante is a 1965 Mexican comedy film starring Viruta and Capulina.

External links

Mexican comedy films
Films with screenplays by Roberto Gómez Bolaños
1960s Mexican films